Eldorado High School is a public 9–12 high school located in northeast Albuquerque, New Mexico within the Albuquerque Public Schools district.

School grade
The NMPED (New Mexico Public Education department) replaced the "No child left behind act" and AYP testing with a new school grading formula, which took effect for the 2010–11 school years. The grade is calculated using many forms of testing, and includes graduation rates.

Athletics

Eldorado competes in the New Mexico Activities Association 5A-District 2, along with Farmington High School, La Cueva High School, Piedra Vista High School and West Mesa High School. Eldorado's mascot is the Golden Eagle and has nineteen teams participating in fourteen boys and girls sports; Eldorado's main rival is La Cueva High School.

Sports and State Titles

Boys (34 titles)
Football: 1980
Soccer: 1995, 2000, 2001, 2003, 2005, 2006, 2010, 2011
Cross Country: 1997
Basketball: 1983, 2004, 2005, 2012
Gymnastics: 1985
Wrestling: 1983, 1986, 1987, 2006
Swimming: 1993, 2012, 2013
Golf: 
Baseball: 1985, 1992, 1993, 1997, 1999, 2000, 2001, 2015
Tennis: 2002, 2016, 2017, Michael Mounho (2016,2017)), 2018
Track and Field: 

Girls (50 titles)
Volleyball: 0
Soccer: 1981, 1982, 1984, 1986, 1987, 1988, 1989, 1992, 1999, 2001, 2009, 2013
Cross Country: 2006, 2007, 2009, 2010, 2018
Basketball: 1978, 1980, 1981, 1983, 1984, 1986, 1987, 1989, 1990, 1992, 1993, 1995
Swimming: 1973, 1974, 1975, 2013, 2014
Golf: 
Softball: 
Tennis: 2013, 2017, 2018
Track and Field: 1985, 1986, 1992, 2001, 2002
Dance/Drill: 1982, 1983, 2001, 2003, 2004, 2005, 2006, 2012
Cheer: [needs updating]

Notable alumni
 Beth Coats, Olympic biathlete
 Daniel Crothers, Justice, North Dakota Supreme Court
 Trent Dimas, Olympic gold medalist
 Jim Everett, professional football player
 Daniel Faris, professional basketball player
 Zach Gentry, professional football player
 James Mercer, musician and front man of The Shins
 Christian Parker (class of 1994), professional baseball player
 Jay Roach, film director
 Devon Sandoval, professional soccer player
 Vince Warren, Super Bowl champion
 Kyle Weiland, professional baseball player

Popular culture
In 2007, the Albuquerque Journal revealed that the high school had been used for the filming of the first season of Breaking Bad.

The high school has been used by Netflix for the filming of Stranger Things season four. The first mention is in Episode 1, "The Hellfire club" as Lenora Hills High School.

The school was featured briefly in Better Call Saul during the season 6 episode “Breaking Bad.”

References

External links
 Eldorado High School Homepage

High schools in Albuquerque, New Mexico
Public high schools in New Mexico
1970 establishments in New Mexico
Educational institutions established in 1970